The Efogi tree frog (Litoria prora) is a species of frog in the subfamily Pelodryadinae. It is found in New Guinea.

Its natural habitats are subtropical or tropical moist lowland forests, subtropical or tropical moist montane forests, rivers, freshwater marshes, intermittent freshwater marshes, rural gardens, and heavily degraded former forest. It is threatened by habitat loss.

References

Litoria
Amphibians of Papua New Guinea
Amphibians described in 1969
Taxonomy articles created by Polbot